Chorizocarpa is a genus of ascidian tunicates in the family Styelidae.

Species within the genus Chorizocarpa include:
 Chorizocarpa guttata Michaelsen, 1904 
 Chorizocarpa michaelseni (Sluiter, 1900) 
 Chorizocarpa sydneyensis (Herdman, 1891)

Species names currently considered to be synonyms:
 Chorizocarpa elegans (Quoy & Gaimard, 1834): synonym of Botryllus elegans (Quoy & Gaimard, 1834) 
 Chorizocarpa sydneiensis (Herdman, 1891): synonym of Chorizocarpa sydneyensis (Herdman, 1891)

References

Stolidobranchia
Tunicate genera